Familien Olsen is a 1940 Danish family film directed by Lau Lauritzen Jr. and Alice O'Fredericks.

Cast
Osvald Helmuth as Grønthandler Alfred Olsen
Maria Garland as Christine Olsen
Berthe Qvistgaard as Karen Olsen
Karl Gustav Ahlefeldt as Willy Alfred Olsen
Ib Schønberg as Gramstrup
Axel Frische as Niels Sønderfeldt
Sigfred Johansen as Hugo Sønderfeldt
Jon Iversen as Statsadvokaten
Ejner Federspiel as Nævningeleder
Viggo Brodthagen as Simonsen
Erika Voigt as Fru Andersen
Arthur Jensen - Hr. Borck
Ingeborg Pehrson as Hugos tante
Peter Nielsen - Bestyrelsesformand
Victor Cornelius as Pianisten
Sigurd Langberg as Rasmus
Sigrid Horne-Rasmussen as Sofie
Ellen Jansø

References

External links

1940 films
1940 drama films
Danish drama films
1940s Danish-language films
Danish black-and-white films
Films directed by Lau Lauritzen Jr.
Films directed by Alice O'Fredericks